The Commonwealth Table Tennis Championships was born at a meeting of Commonwealth delegates in Munich at the 1969 World Championships. Prior to inclusion in the Commonwealth Games proper in 2002, 15 Commonwealth Championships have taken place since 1971.

Venues
 1971 —  Singapore — Singapore Badminton Stadium (20 March to 25 March)
 1973 —  Cardiff, Wales — National Sports Centre (26 March to 1 April)
 1975 —  Melbourne, Australia — Town Hall (25 January to 31 January)
 1977 —  St Peter Port, Guernsey — Beau Sejour Leisure Centre (16 March to 22 March)
 1979 —  Edinburgh, Scotland — Meadowbank Sports Centre (12 April to 18 April)
 1982 —  Bombay, India — Temporary stadium on cricket pitch at Khar Gymkhana (3 February to 9 February)
 1983 —  Kuala Lumpur, Malaysia — Stadium Negara (17 April to 23 April)
 1985 —  Douglas, Isle of Man — Palace Lido Ballroom (17 March to 23 March)
 1989 —  Cardiff, Wales — National Sports Centre (20 March to 26 March)
 1991 —  Nairobi, Kenya — Moi International Sports Centre (14 April to 21 April)
 1994 —  Hyderabad, Andhra Pradesh, India — Lal Bahadur Indoor Stadium (25 January to 1 February)
 1995 —  Singapore — Singapore Badminton Hall (21 April to 28 April)
 1997 —  Glasgow, Scotland — Kelvin Hall (14 April to 20 April)
 2000 —  Singapore — Singapore Table Tennis Academy and Toa Payoh Sports Hall (11 February to 17 February)
 2001 —  New Delhi, India — Indira Gandhi Indoor Stadium (14 April to 20 April)
 2004 —  Kuala Lumpur, Malaysia — Kuala Lumpur Badminton Stadium (21 June to 27 June)
 2007 —  Jaipur, India — SMS Indoor Stadium (30 May to 5 June)
 2009 —  Glasgow, Scotland — Scotstoun Leisure Centre (19 May to 25 May)
 2013 —  New Delhi, India — Thyagraj Indoor Stadium (5 May to 10 May)
 2015 —  Surat, India — Pandit Dindayal Upadhyay Indoor Stadium (16 December to 21 December)
2019 —  Cuttack, India — Jawahar Lal Nehru Indoor Stadium (17 July to 22 July)

Winners

Gallery

See also
Table tennis at the Commonwealth Games

References

External links
ITTF Database
Commonwealth Table Tennis Federation Website

Table Tennis
Table tennis competitions
Table tennis at the Commonwealth Games